The University College Stockholm, formerly the Stockholm School of Theology, is an independent school for theology and human rights in Stockholm, Sweden, sponsored by the Uniting Church in Sweden.

In cooperation with Uppsala University, Stockholm School of Theology also awards a Master's degree in human rights.

The school declares an ecumenical ambition and students include future pastors in the denomination, but also a sizable group training for clerical positions in the Church of Sweden, as well as others.

References

External links
Official website (English)
Official website (Swedish)

University colleges in Sweden
Higher education in Stockholm
Seminaries and theological colleges in Sweden